Ronco is an American small appliances company.

Ronco may also refer to:

Places
Ronco, Pennsylvania, United States
Ronco, a hamlet in Bedretto, Ticino, Switzerland
Ronco, a hamlet in Quinto, Ticino, Switzerland
Ronco, a frazione of the commune Corteno Golgi, Italy
 Ronco all'Adige, municipality in the Province of Verona in the Italian region Veneto
 Ronco Biellese, municipality in the Province of Biella in the Italian region Piedmont
 Ronco Briantino, municipality in the Province of Monza and Brianza in the Italian region Lombardy 
 Ronco Canavese, municipality in the Metropolitan City of Turin in the Italian region Piedmont
 Ronco Scrivia, municipality in the Metropolitan City of Genoa in the Italian region Liguria
 Ronco sopra Ascona, municipality near Locarno in the canton of Ticino in Switzerland

Other uses
Ronco (genus), a genus of crustaceans in the family Pontogeneiidae
RONCO Consulting, an American mine and unexploded ordnance clearance company 
Ronco, a river in Italy, part of Bidente-Ronco

Ronco, an American pasta brand owned by TreeHouse Foods
 Bidente-Ronco, a river in the Emilia-Romagna region of Italy

See also